Bella Abramovna Subbotovskaya (17 December 1937 – 23 September 1982) was a Soviet mathematician who founded the short-lived Jewish People's University (1978–1983) in Moscow. The school's purpose was to offer free education to those affected by structured anti-Semitism within the Soviet educational system. Its existence was outside Soviet authority and it was investigated by the KGB. Subbotovskaya herself was interrogated a number of times by the KGB and shortly thereafter was hit by a truck and died, in what has been speculated was an assassination.

Academic work 
Prior to founding the Jewish People's University, Subbotovskaya published papers in mathematical logic.

Random restrictions 
Subbotovskaya invented the method of random restrictions to Boolean functions. Take the following function:

.

The following is a restriction of one variable

.

To sample a random restriction, retain  variables uniformly at random. For each remaining variable, assign it 0 or 1 with equal probability.

Formula Size and Restrictions 

As demonstrated in the above example, applying a restriction to a function can massively reduce the size of its formula. Though  is written with 7 variables, by only restricting one variable, we found that  uses only 1.

,

where  is the minimum number of variables in the formula. Applying Markov's inequality we see

.

Example application 

Take  to be the parity function over  variables. After applying a random restriction of  variables, we know that  is either  or  depending the parity of the assignments to the remaining variables. Thus clearly the size of the circuit that computes  is exactly 1.

.

Thus we have proven that the smallest circuit to compute the parity of  variables using only  must use at least this many variables.

Influence 

Although this is not an exceptionally strong lower bound, random restrictions have become an essential tool in complexity.
Additionally, Håstad's Switching lemma (1987) applied the same technique to the much richer model of constant depth Boolean circuits.

References 

20th-century Russian mathematicians
1938 births
1982 deaths
20th-century women mathematicians